Peter Lawrence Lonard (born 17 July 1967) is an Australian professional golfer who has played mainly on the U.S.-based PGA Tour.

Early life

Lonard was born at Epping, Sydney.

Professional career

Lonard turned professional in 1989 and began his career on the PGA Tour of Australasia. He played on the European Tour in 1991 and 1992, where he had very moderate results. He was sidelined for nearly 18 months in 1993–94 after contracting Ross River Fever, a mosquito-carried virus which caused damage to his eyes. He worked as a club professional at Sydney's prestigious Oatlands Golf Club for three years before returning to tournament golf, topping the PGA Tour of Australasia Order of Merit in 1996/97. He returned to the European Tour in 1997 and has performed steadily with a best Order of Merit placing of 18th in 2002.

Lonard joined the United States-based PGA Tour in 2002 and settled in well, winning over $1 million in his first season. He won the PGA Tour of Australasia's Order of Merit for a second time in 2003. His first win in the U.S. came at the 2005 MCI Heritage. He has featured in the top 50 of the Official World Golf Ranking. In 2009 he finished outside the top 150 of the money list and lost his PGA Tour card. He has mainly focused on the PGA Tour of Australasia and Web.com Tour since losing his PGA Tour card.

Lonard was a member of the International Team at the Presidents Cup in 2003 and 2005.

After turning 50, Lonard played in the Senior Open Championship in 2017 and finished T3.

Professional wins (12)

PGA Tour wins (1)

PGA Tour of Australasia wins (9)

*Lonard and Moseley agreed to share the 2002 Australian PGA Championship after failing light caused play to halt after one hole of a playoff.

PGA Tour of Australasia playoff record (2–1–1)

Von Nida Tour wins (1)

Other wins (1)

Results in major championships

CUT = missed the half-way cut
"T" = tied

Summary

Most consecutive cuts made – 6 (1999 Open Championship – 2002 PGA)
Longest streak of top-10s – 0

Results in The Players Championship

CUT = missed the halfway cut
"T" indicates a tie for a place

Results in World Golf championships

QF, R16, R32, R64 = Round in which player lost in match play
"T" = Tied

Results in senior major championships

"T" indicates a tie for a place

Team appearances
Presidents Cup (International Team): 2003 (tie), 2005
WGC-World Cup (representing Australia): 2005

See also
2001 PGA Tour Qualifying School graduates

References

External links

Australian male golfers
PGA Tour of Australasia golfers
European Tour golfers
PGA Tour golfers
Australian people of Greek descent
Golfers from Sydney
People from Windermere, Florida
1967 births
Living people